The Keasey Formation is a geologic formation in northwestern Oregon. It preserves fossils dating back to the Paleogene period.

References

Further reading 
  T. Nyborg, B. Nyborg, A. Garassino and F. J. Vega. 2016. New occurrences of fossil Macrocheira (Brachyura, Inachidae) from the North Eastern Pacific. Paleontologia Mexicana 5(2):123-135
 B. J. Welton. 2016. A new dalatiid shark (Squaliformes: Daltaiidae) from the early Oligocene of Oregon and California, USA. Fossil Record 5:289-302
 B. J. Welton. 2013. A new archaic basking shark (Lamniformes, Cetorhinidae) from the Late Eocene of Western Oregon, USA, and description of the dentition, gill rakers and vertebrae of the recent basking shark Cetorhinus Maximus (Gunnerus). New Mexico Museum of Natural History and Science Bulletin 58:1-48
 J. L. Goedert. 1989. Giant late Eocene Marine birds (Pelicaniformes: Pelagornithidae) from northwestern Oregon. Journal of Paleontology 63(6):939-944
 J. L. Goedert. 1988. A new late Eocene species of Plotopteridae (Aves: Pelecaniformes) from northwestern Oregon. Proceedings of the California Academy of Sciences 45(6):97-102
 C. J. Hickman. 1976. Bathyal gastropods of the family Turridae in the Early Oligocene Keasey Formation in Oregon, with a review of some deep-water genera in the Paleocene of the Eastern Pacific. Bulletins of American Paleontology 70(292):1-119
 A. K. Miller and H. R. Downs. 1950. Tertiary nautiloids of the Americas: supplement. Journal of Paleontology 24:1-18

Geology of Oregon